The Photograph is a 2020 American romantic drama film written and directed by Stella Meghie. It follows the estranged daughter (Issa Rae) of a famous photographer who falls in love with the journalist (LaKeith Stanfield) who is investigating her late mother's life. Chelsea Peretti, Lil Rel Howery and Courtney B. Vance also star.

The film was released in the United States on February 14, 2020, by Universal Pictures. It received generally favorable reviews from critics and grossed $21 million.

Plot 
A reporter named Michael meets a man named Isaac to interview him about his life post-Hurricane Katrina. Michael takes an interest in one particular picture in Isaac's home of a woman named Christina Eames, and wants to know her backstory.

In the present day Mae, Christina's daughter, inherits a safety deposit box which includes the same picture of herself and two letters. The first is to Mae and the second is for Mae to deliver to her father.

Back in New York Michael meets Mae who works as an assistant curator. She pulls Christina's archival material to show Michael.

Attracted to Mae, Michael intentionally sets up a "chance meeting" with her at a French movie screening her gallery is showing. They flirt and decide to go on their first date, ending with a kiss. They begin to date but this coincides with Michael getting a job in London. Michael struggles to tell Mae about the move as their relationship is new and begins to ignore her calls.

In the past, Christina has a flirtatious friendship with Isaac. Eventually, Christina and Isaac begin to live together but Christina is bored of her life as she longs to pursue a career in photography. Without telling Isaac she gets on a bus leaving for New York City, and gets a job as an assistant photographer. She calls her friend Denise to give her the good news, who tells Christina that her mother has passed away. At the funeral, she mentions that she is going to visit Isaac, but Denise tells her that he married shortly after she left.

A few years later Christina returns to her hometown with Mae. They take a photograph in her old home. While there they run into Isaac who offers to bring them to dinner to meet his wife. Christina refuses and becomes very emotional, kissing Isaac's cheek and crying afterwards which Mae remembers, even as an adult.

In the present day, Mae meets Isaac and delivers the letter Christina wrote letting him know that her letter said he is her biological father. He admits to suspecting it when he met Mae as a child but was too afraid to ask Christina.

Michael goes to meet Isaac and finish his article and is surprised to see Mae there. They spend the day together and at the end Michael tells her that he got a job in London and will be leaving soon but would like to continue the relationship. Mae tells him long distance isn't practical. Mae works on putting together a retrospective of her mother's work and finds a video where her mother says she wishes she had been better at loving people.

While working in London Michael gets an invitation from Mae to see a Kendrick Lamar concert. Mae and Michael meet up and Mae finally confesses her feelings for him with the two vowing to work things out despite the distance.

Cast 

 Issa Rae as Mae Morton
 Dakota Paradise as Young Mae Morton
 LaKeith Stanfield as Michael Block
 Kelvin Harrison Jr. as Andy Morrison
 Chanté Adams as Christina Eames
 Jasmine Cephas Jones as Rachel Miller
 Lil Rel Howery as Kyle
 Teyonah Parris as Asia
 Rob Morgan as Isaac Jefferson
 Y'lan Noel as Young Issac Jefferson
 Courtney B. Vance as Louis Morton
 Chelsea Peretti as Sara Rodgers
 Maxwell Whittington-Cooper as Peter Thomas
 Marsha Stephanie Blake as Violet Eames
Phoenix Noelle as Sophia 
Rylee Gabrielle King as Sandrine

Production 
It was announced in March 2019 that Issa Rae and Lakeith Stanfield would star in the film, with Stella Meghie writing and directing. Chelsea Peretti, Kelvin Harrison Jr., Chanté Adams, Jasmine Cephas Jones, Y'lan Noel, Lil Rel Howery, Teyonah Parris, Rob Morgan, and Courtney B. Vance were added to the cast shortly after.

Principal photography began on April 25, 2019, taking place around New Orleans.

Release
The Photograph was released in the United States on February 14, 2020 by Universal Pictures.

Reception

Box office
In the United States and Canada, the film was released alongside Fantasy Island, Sonic the Hedgehog and Downhill, and was projected to gross $12–15 million from 2,516 theaters in its opening weekend. The film made $6.3 million on its first day, including $650,000 from Thursday night previews. It debuted to $13.4 million, finishing fourth at the box office. The film dropped 77% in its second weekend to $2.8 million, finishing 10th.

Critical response
The website's critics consensus reads: "Gorgeous visuals, an affecting love story, and simmering chemistry between Issa Rae and Lakeith Stanfield keep The Photograph solidly in focus." On Metacritic, the film has a weighted average score of 62 out of 100, based on 27 critics, indicating "generally favorable reviews". Audiences polled by CinemaScore gave the film an average grade of "B+" on an A+ to F scale, and PostTrak reported it received an average 3 out of 5 stars, with 49% of people saying they definitely would recommend it.

Issa Rae's performance was appreciated by critics, earning a nominations at the 52nd NAACP Image Awards for Outstanding Actress in a Motion Picture and the 46th People's Choice Awards for Drama Movie Star of 2020.

References

External links 
 
 

2020 films
2020 romantic drama films
American romantic drama films
Films directed by Stella Meghie
Films produced by Will Packer
Universal Pictures films
Will Packer Productions films
2020s English-language films
2020s American films
African-American films